Nonthaburi is one of the central provinces (changwat) of Thailand, established by the Act Establishing Changwat Samut Prakan, Changwat Nonthaburi, Changwat Samut Sakhon and Changwat Nakhon Nayok, Buddhist Era 2489 (1946), which came into force on 9 May 1946 (Thursday).

Neighboring provinces are (from north clockwise) Phra Nakhon Si Ayutthaya, Pathum Thani, Bangkok, and Nakhon Pathom. Nonthaburi is the most densely populated province after Bangkok. The Bang Kwang Central Prison is in the province.

Geography
Nonthaburi is directly northwest of Bangkok on the Chao Phraya River. The province is part of the greater Bangkok Metropolitan Area. In most parts it is as urbanized as the capital, and the boundary between the two provinces is nearly unrecognizable. There is no forest area in the province.

History
Nonthaburi was declared a city in the middle of the 16th century. It was previously a village named Talat Khwan. During the reign of King Prasat Thong, a canal was dug to create a shortcut for the flow of the Chao Phraya. The river changed its flow into the new canal, which is still the riverbed today. In 1665 King Narai built a fortress, as the shorter river course was giving enemies an easier route to the capital, Ayutthaya. The town was then moved near the fortress.

From 1943 to 1946 the province was incorporated into Bangkok.

Symbols
The provincial seal shows earthenware, a traditional product of Nonthaburi. The provincial tree and flower is the yellow flame tree (Peltophorum pterocarpum).

The provincial slogan translates to "Grand royal mansion, renowned Suan Somdet, Ko Kret's pottery, famous ancient temples, tasty durians, and the beautiful government office". The royal mansion refers to Phra Tamnak Nonthaburi in Mueang Nonthaburi District, the former residence of Prince Maha Vajiralongkorn. Princess Mother Srinagarindra Garden (Suan Somdet) is a water garden with a statue of princess Srinagarindra in the Pak Kret District. The provincial administration building once received an award as the most beautiful such building by the Ministry of Interior.

Agriculture
Nonthaburi province is renowned for growing the best durians in the country. Durian has been a well-known fruit in this province for 400 years. The fruit is known as "Durian Non" which means durian from Nonthaburi province. It is also known as the most expensive durian in the world. There are six groups of Nonthaburi durian which are Kop, Luang, Kan Yao, Kampan, Thong Yoi, and miscellaneous. Most durian orchards are near rivers such as the Chao Phraya. This is because the soil next to the river is good for planting which is also good for durian trees. Many durian orchards have disappeared due to flooding and pollution. The price of durian Non depends on its group. Kan Yao is the most expensive, starting from around 10,000 baht up to 20,000 baht (or about US$600) for one durian. The Kan Yao itself is not easy to find in normal markets. The main reason for the high price is because it is rare. The recent flood in 2011 cleared out almost all of the durian trees in Nonthaburi, and only a few trees have been newly planted. Also, residential areas are expanding into agricultural areas.

Health 
Nonthaburi's main hospital operated by the Ministry of Public Health is Phra Nang Klao Hospital. It is also the location of the largest psychiatric hospital in Thailand- Srithanya Hospital.

Religion

Administrative divisions

Provincial government
The province is divided into six districts (amphoes). The districts are further subdivided into 52 subdistricts (tambons) and 433 villages (mubans).

Mueang Nonthaburi
Bang Kruai
Bang Yai
Bang Bua Thong
Sai Noi
Pak Kret

Local government
As of 8 September 2020 there are: one Nonthaburi Provincial Administrative Organization - PAO and twenty-two municipal (thesaban) areas in the province. The capital Nonthaburi and Pak Kret have city (thesaban nakhon) status. Further ten have town (thesaban mueang) status and ten subdistrict  municipalities (thesaban tambon).

The non-municipal areas are administered by 23 Subdistrict Administrative
Organizations - SAO (ongkan borihan suan tambon).

Human achievement index 2017

Since 2003, United Nations Development Programme (UNDP) in Thailand has tracked progress on human development at sub-national level using the Human achievement index (HAI), a composite index covering all the eight key areas of human development. National Economic and Social Development Board (NESDB) has taken over this task since 2017.

Notable people
 

Sriarpha Ruennak (born 1956), Thai voice actress
Busanan Ongbamrungphan (born 1996), Thai badminton player

See also
Muang Thong Thani, a large real estate development in Nonthaburi
International School Bangkok, school in Nonthaburi
Srithanya Hospital, hospital in Nonthaburi

References

External links

Province page from the Tourist Authority of Thailand
Official website (Thai only)

Nonthaburi provincial map, coat of arms and postal stamp
Local history and Durian

 
Provinces of Thailand